Velký Újezd is a market town in Olomouc District in the Olomouc Region of the Czech Republic. It has about 1,300 inhabitants.

References

Populated places in Olomouc District
Market towns in the Czech Republic